Ninth Street West Historic District is a national historic district located at Huntington, Cabell County, West Virginia. The district encompasses 12 contributing buildings in the St. Cloud neighborhood in the western section of Huntington.  It is a significant enclave of late 19th and early 20th century residences in the Late Victorian style, most notably Queen Anne.  The period of development is from 1870 to 1933.

It was listed on the National Register of Historic Places in 1980.

References

Houses on the National Register of Historic Places in West Virginia
Historic districts in Cabell County, West Virginia
Queen Anne architecture in West Virginia
Victorian architecture in West Virginia
Houses in Huntington, West Virginia
National Register of Historic Places in Cabell County, West Virginia
Historic districts on the National Register of Historic Places in West Virginia